Kalugin is a Russian surname. Notable people with the surname include:

 Erik Kalugin (1937–2003), Soviet sprint canoer
 Oleg Kalugin (born 1934), former Soviet KGB general
 Oleg Vladimirovich Kalugin (born 1989), Russian football midfielder
 Sergey Kalugin (born 1967), Russian musician, leader of the rock band Orgia Pravednikov

Russian-language surnames